Rough House Rosie is a 1927 American silent romantic comedy film produced and released by Paramount Pictures and directed by Frank Strayer. The film is a starring vehicle for Clara Bow who was then Paramount's most popular actress. Reed Howes, a model turned actor, is Bow's leading man.

The film was based on the story of the same name by Nunnally Johnson that appeared in The Saturday Evening Post. The story was adapted for the screen by Max Marcin, with a screenplay by Louise Long and Ethel Doherty and titles by George Marion, Jr. Rough House Rosie is now presumed lost, but a 53-second trailer survives

Cast
Clara Bow as Rosie O'Reilly
Reed Howes as Joe Hennessey
Arthur Housman as Kid Farrell
Doris Hill as Ruth
Douglas Gilmore as Arthur Russell
John Miljan as Lew McKay
Henry Kolker as W.S. Davids

See also
List of lost films
The Main Event (1927)

References

External links

Poster; old version
Skinny lobby poster

1927 films
1927 romantic comedy films
American romantic comedy films
American silent feature films
American black-and-white films
Films based on short fiction
Films directed by Frank R. Strayer
Lost American films
Paramount Pictures films
Lost comedy films
1927 lost films
1920s American films
Silent romantic comedy films
Silent American comedy films